Radio Voice of Revolutionary Ethiopia was the former Radio Voice of the Gospel in Addis Abeba.

The station was  confiscated by the Revolutionary Military Government in 1974 and is now only propagating  Marxist ideas

The infrastructure of the station at the time of confiscation consisted of two strong 100 kW transmitters with directional antennas, one medium wave transmitter and studios in Addis Ababa.

Mass media in Ethiopia